Raimund Schelcher (27 March 1910 – 27 March 1972) was a German actor with Tanzanian citizenship who appeared in over 43 films and television programs between 1939 and 1971.

Personal life 
He was born in Dar es Salaam, German East Africa (now Tanzania) to a railway engineer and a violinist. When Schelcher was fourteen, his family were evacuated to Germany after World War I.  Between 1924 and 1928 he visited the Oberrealschule Kalk in Cologne. After earning a Mittlere Reife and after leaving school he entered the theatre. From 1928 to 1938 he took acting lessons at the Municipal drama school in Cologne.

He died on his 62nd birthday in Berlin on 27 March 1972.

Career 
In 1930 he debuted his role as Ferdinand in Intrigue and Love at the Theater Gießen. In 1933 Schelcher joined the New Theatre in Frankfurt am Main and in 1934-1935 he played at the Deutsches Schauspielhaus in Hamburg, from 1935 to 1938 in Leipzig and finally at the Schiller Theater in Berlin. In 1939 he received his first film roles.

World War II 
He was drafted shortly before World War II on 28 August 1939 by the Gestapo. He was drafted as a soldier and was "probation battalion assigned". In battle, he was wounded four times and he fell into Soviet captivity. After his release he resumed his career at the Stadttheater in Bremen.

Return to Acting 

In 1950 he went to the eastern part of Berlin's Deutsches Theater and performed at the Volksbühne. From 1953 he worked at the Berliner Ensemble. Schlecher played, among others, the fool in the Twelfth Night, Jakob in Gorkis and Simon Chachava in The Caucasian Chalk Circle. Schelcher worked in the 1950s as a DEFA actor. He was helped by his clear-cut features.  He appeared in films featuring ideal class-conscious proletarians as in two of Thalmann's movies or as the understanding people's commissar in Berlin, Schoenhauser Corner.

Filmography

Recognition 
 Medal of Merit of the National People's Army in silver step by step
 National Prize of East Germany for his role as Fritzweiler in piece woman Flinz

External links

References 

1910 births
1972 deaths
People from Dar es Salaam
Colonial people of German East Africa
Tanzanian people of German descent
German male film actors
German male television actors
Tanzanian emigrants to Germany
German male stage actors
20th-century German male actors
German Army personnel of World War II
Recipients of the National Prize of East Germany
German prisoners of war in World War II held by the Soviet Union